The Five Strumica Students refers to a group of five students on the age from 20-23, all born in Strumica that on August 13, 1951 were executed by authorities in Communist Yugoslavia. In the information report of the authorities it was stated that the group was planning to illegally cross the border to Greece, but their relatives claimed that they were killed because of ideas close to IMRO, an organization that fought for the independence of Macedonia. A large crowd flocked to the funeral of those killed, and their relatives built a large common gravestone, but after a few months the UDBA blew it up. At that time the Yugoslav authorities conducted a series of raids and executions to prevent the influence of the inherits of IMRO, this being one of them.

References

External links 
 Five Strumica Students, documentary about the group and testimonials of their families
 CIA document on the five Strumica students 1
 CIA document on the five Strumica students 2

Yugoslav Macedonia
Internal Macedonian Revolutionary Organization
1951 in the Socialist Republic of Macedonia
Yugoslav Macedonia in World War II
Political repression in Communist Yugoslavia
August 1951 events in Europe
Ethnic cleansing in Europe
Aftermath of World War II in Yugoslavia
Conflicts in 1951